Kruševačka Planina (Maja e Krushevaçkës in Albanian) is a mountain found in Kosovo in the Šar Mountains in Gora (region) next to North Macedonia and Albania.
The nearest peaks are Murga (peak) and Popova Sapka, the next town is Brod (Prizren), the next biggest lake is Šutmansko Lake. It is one of the highest peaks in Kosovo.

Notes and references

Notes:

References:

Mountains of Kosovo
Šar Mountains
Two-thousanders of Kosovo